The Mozi, also called the Mojing or the Mohist canon, is an ancient Chinese text from the Warring States period (476–221) that expounds the philosophy of Mohism.  It propounds such Mohist ideas as impartiality, meritocratic governance, economic growth and aversion to ostentation, and is known for its plain and simple language.

The chapters of the Mozi can be divided into several categories: a core group of 31 chapters, which contain the basic philosophic ideas of the Mohist school; several chapters on logic, which are among the most important early Chinese texts on logic and are traditionally known as the "Dialectical Chapters"; five sections containing stories and information about Mozi and his followers; and eleven chapters on technology and defensive warfare, on which the Mohists were expert and which are valuable sources of information on ancient Chinese military technology.  There are also two other minor sections: an initial group of seven chapters that are clearly of a much later date, and two anti-Confucian chapters, only one of which has survived.

The Mohist philosophical school died out in the 3rd century BC, and copies of the Mozi were not well preserved.  The modern text has been described as "notoriously corrupt". Of the Mozi 71 original chapters, 18 have been lost and several others are badly fragmented.

Authorship

The Mozi, as well as the entire philosophical school of Mohism, is named for and traditionally ascribed to Mo Di, usually known as "Mozi" (Mandarin Chinese:  , "Master Mo"). Mozi is a figure from the 5th century BC about whom nothing is reliably known.  Most sources describe him as being from the State of Lu—though one says that he was from the State of Song—and say that he traveled around the various Warring States trying to persuade their rulers to stop attacking each other.  Mozi seems to have come from a humble family, and some elements of the book suggest that he may have been some type of artisan or craftsman, such as a carpenter.  Some scholars have theorized that the name Mo, which means "ink", may not truly be a surname, but could be indicative of Mozi having undergone the branding or tattooing that was used in ancient China as a form of criminal punishment.

Content
The Mozi originally comprised 71 chapters. However, 18 of the original chapters have been lost, and several others are damaged and fragmented.  The text can be divided into a total of six sections:

Chapters 1–7: a group of miscellaneous essays and dialogues that were clearly added at a later date and are somewhat incongruous with the rest of the book.
Chapters 8–37: a large group of chaptersof which seven are missing and three are fragmentarythat form the core Mozi chapters and elucidate the ten main philosophical doctrines of the Mohist school of thought.  Mozi is frequently referenced and cited in these chapters.
Chapters 38–39: two chaptersof which only chapter 39 survivesentitled "Against Confucianism", containing polemical arguments against the ideals of Confucianism.  These chapters are sometimes grouped with chapters 8–37.
Chapters 40–45: a group of six chapters, often called the "Dialectical Chapters", which are some of the most unique writings of ancient China. They cover topics in logic, epistemology, ethics, geometry, optics, and mechanics.  The "Dialectical Chapters" are dense and difficult, largely because the text is badly garbled and corrupted.
Chapters 46–51: six chaptersof which chapter 51, including even its title, has been lostthat contain stories and dialogues about Mozi and his followers.  These chapters are probably of somewhat later date, and are probably partly fictional.
Chapters 52–71: a group of chaptersnine of which have been lostknown as the "Military Chapters", containing instructions on defensive warfare, supposedly from Mozi to his chief disciple Qin Guli.  These chapters are badly damaged and corrupted.

Selected translations
The damaged nature of the later chapters of the Mozi have made its translations highly difficult, and often requires translators to repair and re-edit the text before translating. The first Mozi translation in a Western languagethe 1922 German translation of Alfred Forkewas done before these problems were well understood, and thus contains many errors in the "Dialectical" and "Military" chapters. Only in the late 20th century did accurate translations of the later Mozi chapters appear.

 Alfred Forke (1922), Mê Ti: Des Socialethikers und seiner Schüler philosophische Werke, Berlin: Kommissionsverlag der Vereinigung wissenschaftlicher Verleger.
 Y. P. Mei (1929), The Ethical and Political Works of Motse, London: Probsthain.  Reprinted (1974), Taipei: Ch'eng-wen.
 Burton Watson (1963), Mo Tzu: Basic Writings, New York: Columbia University Press.
 A. C. Graham (1978), Later Mohist Logic, Ethics, and Science, Hong Kong: Chinese University Press.
 Ian Johnston (2010), The Mozi: A Complete Translation, Hong Kong: Chinese University Press.
 Chris Fraser (2020), The Essential Mòzǐ: Ethical, Political, and Dialectical Writings, New York: Oxford University Press.

Many Mozi translations into Modern Chinese and Japanese exist.

References

Citations

Sources 
 Works cited

External links
 
 

Ancient Chinese philosophical literature
East Asian religious texts
Philosophy books
Religion in China
Religious philosophical literature
Religious texts
Zhou dynasty texts
5th-century BC books